The OSJ Ontake SkyRace was an international skyrunning competition held for the first time in 2006 and till 2014. It ran every year in Nagano (Mount Ontake, Japan) in August. The race was valid for the Skyrunner World Series six times consecutively from 2006 to 2011.

Races
 OSJ Ontake SkyRace, a SkyRace (32 km / 1,800 m D+)
 OSJ Ontake Ultra Trail, an Ultra trail (100 km)

OSJ Ontake SkyRace

See also 
 Skyrunner World Series

References

External links 
 Official web site

Skyrunning competitions
Skyrunner World Series
Athletics competitions in Japan
Sports competitions in Nagano Prefecture